Issiaka Ouattara (1967 – 5 January 2020) was an Ivorian military serviceman. He served as lieutenant colonel and was part of the Forces Nouvelles de Côte d'Ivoire. Ouattara was also a major player in the First Ivorian Civil War.

References

Ivorian military personnel
1967 births
2020 deaths